Marco Aurélio Silva Businhani (born February 8, 1972), known as Marco Aurélio or just Marco, is a former Brazilian football player.

Club statistics

References

External links

Profile at Zerozero.pt

1972 births
Living people
Brazilian footballers
Brazilian expatriate footballers
J1 League players
Shimizu S-Pulse players
Expatriate footballers in Japan
Association football forwards
People from Bauru
Footballers from São Paulo (state)